Francesco Sorbara  (born February 28, 1971) is a Canadian politician, who was elected to represent the riding of Vaughan—Woodbridge in the House of Commons in the 2015 federal election.

Sorbara is the Parliamentary Secretary to the Minister of National Revenue. He sits on the House of Commons Standing Committee of Public Accounts, the Standing Committee on Access to Information, Privacy and Ethics, as well as being an associate member of the House of Commons Standing Committee of Finance. He is Vice-Chair of the Canada-United States Inter-Parliamentary Group as well as an executive member of the Canada-Europe Parliamentary Association.

Electoral record

References

External links

Living people
Liberal Party of Canada MPs
Members of the House of Commons of Canada from Ontario
1971 births
Canadian financial analysts
People from Prince Rupert, British Columbia
Simon Fraser University alumni
University of Toronto alumni
JPMorgan Chase employees
Canadian people of Italian descent
21st-century Canadian politicians
People from Vaughan